Conductor rail may refer to:
 A third rail
 A fourth rail
 A Ground-level power supply

See also 
 Conduit current collection
 Linear motor 
 Stud contact system
 The guide bars on a rubber tired metro